Little Wittenham Bridge is a footbridge across the River Thames in England  near Dorchester-on-Thames, Oxfordshire. It is just downstream of Day's Lock on the reach above Benson Lock and connects Little Wittenham to Dorchester. 

The bridge spans the river in two sections with Lock House Island in between. The lock house, built in 1928 is situated on the island.

The bridge is one of two used in the World Poohsticks Championships for the heats, and is used as the bridge for the final of the event.

See also
Crossings of the River Thames

References

Pedestrian bridges across the River Thames
Bridges in Oxfordshire